Bazoft is a city in Bazoft District of Kuhrang County, Chaharmahal and Bakhtiari province, Iran. Iran. The city consists of two neighbourhoods Telūrd and Chaman Goli. The latest census in 2016 showed a population of 1,519 people in 337 households. The city is populated by Lurs.

References 

Kuhrang County

Cities in Chaharmahal and Bakhtiari Province

Populated places in Chaharmahal and Bakhtiari Province

Populated places in Kuhrang County